Rendsburg (also Rensborg, also Rensborg) is a town on the River Eider and the Kiel Canal in the central part of Schleswig-Holstein, Germany. It is the capital of the Kreis (district) of Rendsburg-Eckernförde. , it had a population of 28,476.

History

Rendsburg's foundation date is unknown though some form of fortifications was established by Bjørn Svendsen 1099–1100. Rendsburg was first mentioned in 1199. An old form of its name was Reinoldesburch.

It became a part of Holstein in the 13th century, but was transferred to Schleswig in 1460. Many times the town passed from Danish to German control and vice versa. In the German-Danish War in 1864 Rendsburg was finally seized by Kingdom of Prussia and Austria. After 1866 the town was annexed by the Kingdom of Prussia. Since that time it has remained part of Germany.

Although the Eider is navigable for small craft from its mouth on the North Sea to Rendsburg, the town's importance rose in 1895, when the Kiel Canal was finished. The much larger ships that could navigate the Kiel Canal meant that, although situated inland, Rendsburg became a seaport and a dockyard.

Sights
The most prominent structure in town, the Rendsburg High Bridge, 
It is the longest railway bridge in Europe (highway/rail bridge Øresund Bridge is longer): on the northern side, the bridge connects to the Rendsburg Loop to gain height and to allow trains to continue to serve the Rendsburg station. Suspended from the railway bridge, a transporter bridge – one of only twenty ever built – traverses the canal.

The German Army's Air Defence School and the Bundesamt für Strahlenschutz are both located in Rendsburg.

Other sights include:
 Town hall, 16th century
 Marienkirche (St. Mary's Church), 1286
 Kiel Canal Pedestrian Tunnel, longest pedestrian tunnel in the world
 The longest bench in the world (501 m), on the banks of the Kiel Canal
 Jewish Museum Rendsburg
 Museums in the Cultural Centre (Historical Museum Rendsburg / Printing Museum)

Notable people

Michael Maier (1568–1622), physician, counsellor to Rudolf II Habsburg
Christian Scriver (1629–1693), Lutheran minister and devotional writer
Marquard Gude (1635–1689), archaeologist and classical scholar
Calmer Hambro (1747–1806), Danish merchant and banker
Theodor Mommsen (1817–1903), classical scholar, historian, jurist, journalist, politician and archaeologist; Germany's first Nobel Prize winner for literature, lived in Rendsburg for many years
Heinrich Adolph Leschen (1836–1916), father of gymnastics and pioneer of medical massage (physiotherapy) in South Australia
Marie Davids (1847–1905), painter
Ludwig Fahrenkrog (1867–1952), writer, playwright and artist
Dagmar Hjort (1860–1902), Danish schoolteacher, writer and women's rights activist
Gustav Kieseritzky (1893–1943), admiral during WWII
Hans Friedemann Götze (1897–1940), SS-Standartenführer in the German Waffen-SS
Hans Egon Holthusen (1913–1997), lyric poet, essayist, and literary scholar
Hans Blohm (born 1927), photographer and author, in Canada
Otto Bernhardt (born 1942), CDU politician
Hans-Ulrich Buchholz (born 1944), rower
Hartmut Lutz (born 1945), professor of American and Canadian studies
Hanne Haller (1950–2005), pop singer, composer, writer, producer and sound engineer
Gerhard Delling (born 1959), journalist and author
Jost de Jager (born 1965) CDU politician
Philip Kraft (born 1969), fragrance chemist
Noah Wunsch (born 1970), painter, photographer and designer.
Alexander Kühl (born 1973), basketball player 
Patrik Borger (born 1979), football player and manager
Lauritz Schoof (born 1990), rower, Olympic winner

Twin towns – sister cities

Rendsburg is twinned with:

 Aalborg, Denmark (1976)
 Almere, Netherlands (2014)
 Haapsalu, Estonia (1989)
 Kristianstad, Sweden (1992)
 Lancaster, England (1968)
 Racibórz County, Poland (2004)
 Rathenow, Germany (1990)
 Skien, Norway (1995)
 Vierzon, France (1975)

References

Towns in Schleswig-Holstein
Rendsburg-Eckernförde